Zabiela is a surname. Notable people with the surname include:

James Zabiela (born 1979), English DJ and producer
Vytautas Zabiela (1930–2019), Lithuanian lawyer and politician
Feminine Zabielaite(non married)
Zabieliene(married)
Can be Lithuanian or Prussian origins surname.
Historians Zabiela, Zabielienė.

See also
 Zabelia
 Zabiele (disambiguation)